Donald Peter Harkness (13 February 1931 – 2 September 2021) was an Australian first-class cricketer who played in thirteen matches for Worcestershire in 1954.

The highlight of Harkness' short first-class career came against Cambridge University in late June 1954, when he hit 163 in two and three-quarter  hours, by a long way his highest score in first-class cricket. Worcestershire nevertheless lost the match. He also played Birmingham League cricket for Kidderminster. 
In Sydney senior cricket in the 1950s and 1960s, Harkness scored 1612 runs and claimed 168 wickets in First Grade with Gordon, St George and Sutherland.

Harkness and his wife Eleanor, who predeceased him, had two daughters. He died in September 2021, aged 90.

References

References
 

1931 births
2021 deaths
Cricketers from Sydney
Australian cricketers
Worcestershire cricketers